Sheikh Khalil Abdillahi Ahmed is a Somali politician currently serving as the Minister of Endowment and Religious Affairs of Somaliland since July 2010.

See also

 Ministry of Endowment and Religious Affairs (Somaliland)
 Politics of Somaliland
 List of Somaliland politicians

References

Peace, Unity, and Development Party politicians
Living people
Government ministers of Somaliland
Year of birth missing (living people)